Holyport Football Club is a football club based in Holyport, near Maidenhead, England.

History
The club was founded in 1934, but disbanded during World War II. After being reformed in 1956 they joined the Maidenhead & District League. The club later transferred to the Hayes & Giles League. They were Premier Division champions in 1998–99 and again the following season. After winning the league for a third time in 2001–02, they moved up to Division One East of the Hellenic League. In 2010–11 the club were Division One East Champions, earning promotion to the Premier Division. The season also saw them win the league's Floodlight Cup and Challenge Cup.

Despite not finishing in the relegation zone, Holyport were voluntarily demoted to Division One East at the end of the 2014–15 season after their manager left and they were unable to find a replacement. In 2021 the club were promoted to the Premier Division North of the Combined Counties League based on their results in the abandoned 2019–20 and 2020–21 seasons.

Ground
After being reformed in 1956, the club played at Windsor Road in nearby Bray. The club moved to Braywick Park in 1998, before relocating to their current ground, Summerleaze Village, in Maidenhead, in 2005. Floodlights were installed during the 2007–08 season, and three stands later erected.

Honours
Hellenic League
Division One East champions 2010–11
Floodlit Cup winners 2010–11
Challenge Cup winners 2010–11
Hayes & Giles League
Premier Division champions 1998–99, 1999–00, 2001–02
Ascot & Fielding Cup
Winners 1999–2000
Norfolkian Senior Cup
Winners 1999–2000

Club records
Best FA Cup performance: Extra preliminary round, 2010–11, 2011–12, 2012–13, 2013–14, 2014–15, 2015–16
Best FA Vase best performance: Second round, 2010–11
Record attendance: 315 vs Binfield, FA Cup first qualifying round, 4 September 2022
Most appearances: Sam Jones, 216
Most goals: Jamie Handscomb, 78 in 138 games
Biggest win: 13–0 vs Prestwood, 12 September 2009
Heaviest defeat: 8–0 vs Finchampstead 29 November 2003: 8–0 vs Rayners Lane 4 September 2004; 8–0 vs Kintbury Rangers, 9 April 2005; 8–0 vs Tunbridge Wells, 13 November 2012

References

External links

Football clubs in England
Football clubs in Berkshire
Association football clubs established in 1934
1934 establishments in England
Hellenic Football League
Combined Counties Football League